Sphingomonas ginsenosidimutans  is a Gram-negative, strictly aerobic, non-spore-forming and non-motile bacteria from the genus of Sphingomonas which has been isolated from soil from a ginseng field in Pocheon in Korea.

References

Further reading

External links
Type strain of Sphingomonas ginsenosidimutans at BacDive -  the Bacterial Diversity Metadatabase

ginsenosidimutans
Bacteria described in 2011